

This is a list of the Pennsylvania state historical markers in Lycoming County.

This is intended to be a complete list of the official state historical markers placed in Lycoming County, Pennsylvania by the Pennsylvania Historical and Museum Commission (PHMC). The locations of the historical markers, as well as the latitude and longitude coordinates as provided by the PHMC's database, are included below when available. There are 30 historical markers located in Lycoming County.

Historical markers

See also

 List of Pennsylvania state historical markers
 National Register of Historic Places listings in Lycoming County, Pennsylvania

References

External links
 Pennsylvania Historical Marker Program
 Pennsylvania Historical & Museum Commission

Pennsylvania state historical markers in Lycoming County
Lycoming County
Tourist attractions in Lycoming County, Pennsylvania